Church of the Pilgrims may refer to:

Church of the Pilgrims (Washington, D.C.)
Church of the Pilgrims (Brooklyn, New York), co-founded by Henry Chandler Bowen

See also
Pilgrim (disambiguation)#Church related